Shaykh Khūbū, better known as Quṭb ad-Dīn Khān Kokah (13 August 1569 – 20 May 1607) was the Mughal subahdar (provincial governor) of Bengal Subah during the reign of the emperor Jahangir. He was appointed governor of Bengal on 2 September 1606 and died in office on 20 May 1607.

Early life and family
Qutb-ud-Din Khan Kokah's original name was Shaikh Khubu. His father was a Mughal courtier in the court of emperor Akbar. His mother was daughter of Salim Chishti of Fatehpur Sikri and the foster mother of Emperor Jahangir. The emperor was deeply attached to his foster mother, as reflected by the following paragraph in the Jahangir's memoirs:

Thus, Shaykh Khubu was the Kokah (foster brother) of emperor Jahangir. The title of Qutb-ud-Din Khan was conferred upon him by Prince Salim (Jahangir) during his rebellion against his father Akbar. He was also appointed subahdar of Bihar by prince Salim during his rebellion.

Subahdar of Bengal
Qutb-ud-Din Khan Kokah was appointed the governor of Bengal in 1606. Eight months later, he led the Mughal forces in a battle against Sher Afghan Quli Khan, the Faujdar of Bardhaman. Qutb-ud-Din Khan Kokah was defeated and killed in that battle.

Progeny
Qutbuddin Khan Kokah had two sons. His first son, Saaduddin Khan received the title Saaduddin Siddiqi and was granted by emperor Jahangir three jagirs called Amenabad, Talebabad and Chandrapratap (now in Gazipur District, Bangladesh). This became the Bangladesh branch of his family. His descendants in Bangladesh include Chowdhury Kazemuddin Ahmed Siddiky, the co-founder of the Assam Bengal Muslim League and the University of Dhaka, Justice Badruddin Ahmed Siddiky, Chowdhury Tanbir Ahmed Siddiky, the Commerce Minister of Bangladesh (1979–81) and Chowdhury Irad Ahmed Siddiky, a candidate for the mayor of Dhaka in 2015.

His second son, Shaykh Ibrahim, received the title of Kishwar Khan and Muhtashim Khan, and was appointed Qiladar (Commandant) of the Rohtas Fort in Bihar. Shaikh Ibrahim was married to Parwar Khanam, the daughter of Asaf Khan (the Grand Vizier of Mughal Empire 1628-41[2]) and sister of Mumtaz Mahal (Empress consort of the Mughal Emperor Shah Jahan and niece of empress Nur Jahan, Jahangir's favorite wife). Shaikh Ibrahim aka Mohtashim Khan was given a jagir of 22 villages in Sheikhupur, Badaun and it is here he built a fort for his family, where his descendants still live to this day. This is the Indian branch of Koka's family, and their descendants include Nawab Abdul-Ghaffar Khan Bahadur, jageerdar of Sheikhupur, Begum Parveen Azad - a senior Indian Congress party politician [the 11th Lok Sabha (1996) Congress-party candidate from Baduan], other relatives include Mohammad Sultan Hyder 'Josh'- a prominent poet and short story writer of Urdu and Begum Abida Ahmed wife of the 5th President of India Fakhruddin Ali Ahmed.

See also
List of rulers of Bengal
History of Bengal

References

1607 deaths
Subahdars of Bengal
Subahdars of Bihar
Year of birth unknown
1569 births